Knockout is a standalone JavaScript implementation of the Model–View–ViewModel pattern with templates. The underlying principles are therefore:

 a clear separation between domain data, view components and data to be displayed
 the presence of a clearly defined layer of specialized code to manage the relationships between the view components

The latter leverages the native event management features of the JavaScript language.

These features streamline and simplify the specification of complex relationships between view components, which in turn make the display more responsive and the user experience richer.

Knockout was developed and is maintained as an open source project by Steve Sanderson.

Features 

Knockout includes the following features:

 Declarative bindings
 Automatic UI refresh (when the data model's state changes, the UI updates automatically)
 Dependency tracking Templating (contains a dedicated template engine, but other templating engines can be used)

Example 

In this example, two text boxes are bound to observable variables on a data model. The "full name" display is bound to a dependent observable, whose value is computed in terms of the observables. When either text box is edited, the "full name" display is automatically updated, with no explicit event handling.

View Model (JavaScript) 

function ViewModel() {
    this.firstName = ko.observable("");
    this.lastName = ko.observable("");

    this.fullName = ko.computed(
        function() { return this.firstName() + " " + this.lastName(); }, 
        this);
}

ko.applyBindings(new ViewModel());

References

External links 
 

Rich web application frameworks
Ajax (programming)
JavaScript libraries